Burnett County, New South Wales is one of the 141 Cadastral divisions of New South Wales.

Burnett County was named in honour of James Charles Burnett, surveyor (1815-1854).

Parishes 
A full list of parishes found within this county; their current LGA and mapping coordinates to the approximate centre of each location is as follows:

References

Counties of New South Wales